Štefan Margita (born 3 August 1956) is a Slovak opera singer who has had an active international career since 1981. He began his career singing mostly roles from the lyric tenor repertoire but in recent years he has tackled a number of dramatic tenor roles. His career has taken him to the stages of many of the world's best opera houses, including La Scala, the Royal Opera, London, the Deutsche Oper Berlin, the Liceu, and the Opéra Bastille. Margita has had his debut performance at the Metropolitan Opera in November 2009 as Luka Kuzmič in Leoš Janáček's From the House of the Dead.

Early life and career
Born in Košice, Margita first was a student at the industrial art school in his home city where he studied to be a photographer. He then entered the Košice Conservatory where he was a pupil of Lydia Šomorjaiová. In 1981 he became a member of the theatre in Prešov and then he worked at the opera house in Košice from 1983 through 1986.

In 1984 Margita won a singing competition in Teplice and in the spring of 1986 he won the international singing competition in Prague. The latter prize gained him an invitation to join the roster of principal singers at the Prague National Theatre beginning in August 1986. He stayed at the house through 1991, working simultaneously as a soloist at the Vienna Volksoper from 1987 to 1991. In 1992 he married Czech singer and actress Hana Zagorová. That same year he joined the Prague State Opera where he remained for two seasons.

Rise to international prominence
In the early 1990s Margita began working as a guest artist with opera houses around the world. In 1991, he sang the role of Lucentio in Hermann Goetz's Der Widerspänstigen Zähmung at the Wexford Festival Opera, toured throughout Japan, and portrayed the role of Don Ottavio in Wolfgang Amadeus Mozart's Don Giovanni at the Savonlinna Opera Festival in Finland. In 1992, he performed Tebaldo in Vincenzo Bellini's I Capuleti e i Montecchi in Budapest and had a major personal triumph as the title hero in Jacques Offenbach's The Tales of Hoffmann at the Prague National Theatre. In 1993 he made his debut at the Maggio Musicale Fiorentino as Laca Klemeň in Janáček's Jenůfa and his first appearance at the Salzburg Festival as Luka Kuzmič in Janáček's From the House of the Dead. In 1994 he debuted at the Leipzig Opera as Don Ottavio and in 1995 he returned to the Maggio Musicale Fiorentino as the title hero in Franz Schubert's Fierrabras. Guest appearances over the next several years included performances at the opera houses in Genoa, Stuttgart, Basel, Berlin, Vienna and Moscow, Turin, Brescia, Milan, Paris and Budapest.

Since 1998, Margita has worked solely as a freelance artist without permanent employment with a particular opera company. Laca Klemeň has become one of his signature roles, giving performances of that role at the Deutsche Oper Berlin, Berlin State Opera, Berlin Philharmonic, Israeli Opera, Opéra National de Lyon, Opéra Royal de Wallonie, Opéra national de Montpellier, De Vlaamse Opera, Glyndebourne Festival Opera, Opera de Oviedo, Saito Kinen Festival Matsumoto, the Théâtre du Châtelet, and the Houston Grand Opera among other houses. In 2005 he made his debut at La Scala as Walther in Richard Wagner's Tannhäuser. In 2006 he made his first appearance at the Teatro Nacional de São Carlos as Froh in Das Rheingold. His career has also taken him to the stages of the Royal Opera House at Covent Garden, the Teatro Comunale Giuseppe Verdi, the Dallas Opera, the Teatro Real, Oper Frankfurt, Theater Basel, the Teatro di San Carlo, the Theatro Municipal in São Paulo, and the New National Theatre Tokyo among others.

Recent career
Recent appearances for Margita include Walther von der Vogelweide at the San Francisco Opera (2007) and the Liceu (2007); Luka Kuzmič at the Vienna Festival (2007), the Aix-en-Provence Festival (2007), and the Teatro Massimo (2008); Loge in Das Rheingold at the San Francisco Opera (2008); Živný in Janáček's Destiny at The Proms (2008); Grigoriy in Boris Godunov at the Semperoper (2008–2009); Laca at the Bavarian State Opera (2009) and Munich Opera Festival (2009); and Edrisi in Karol Szymanowski's King Roger at the Opéra National de Paris (2009). Appearances for the 2009–2010 season included the Drum Major in Wozzeck with the Opéra National de Paris, Loge at La Fenice, and Luka Kuzmič at both the Metropolitan Opera and La Scala.

Discography
  Štefan Margita: Slzy a úsmevy (Tears and Smiles) : Mikuláš Schneider-Trnavský Slovak songs: Slzy a úsmevy, Op. 25., Béla Bartók Hungarian folk songs for voice and piano (Bartók). Sylvie Bodorová Seven Slovak Folksongs for Two Voices, Harp and Piano.  Katarín Bachmann (piano), Gabriela Benacková (soprano) Kateřina Englichová (harp). recorded in the Lichtenštejnský palác, Prague, December 2005, January 2006 ZENTIVA UP 0084–2 131 [57:15] ArcoDiva 2006

References

External links
 Štefan Margita Operabase

1956 births
Living people
Slovak operatic tenors
Musicians from Košice
Recipients of Medal of Merit (Czech Republic)
Czechoslovak male opera singers
21st-century Slovak male opera singers
20th-century Slovak male opera singers